Oz and James Drink to Britain is a BBC television series in which wine writer Oz Clarke and motor journalist James May travel through Britain and Ireland to discover the array of available alcoholic drinks. The series is a sequel to Oz and James's Big Wine Adventure, and followed the same format, with the established dynamic between Clarke and May of bickering and bantering while drinking alcohol. The chosen vehicle of this series is a 1982 Rolls-Royce Corniche convertible.

Upon broadcast the first episode had a viewership of approximately 3.4 million with an average audience share of 15%.

Episode list

DVD
The DVD of Oz and James Drink to Britain, which contains footage not featured on the original BBC broadcasts, was released in the UK on 16 March 2009.

U.S. Broadcast
The series was also broadcast on BBC America, renamed "James May Drinks to Britain."

References

External links
 

Drink to Britain
BBC television documentaries
2009 British television series debuts
2009 British television series endings
English-language television shows